I Believe is the debut English language album by Thai singer Tata Young and was debuted on 14 February 2004 in Singapore and was released on 25 February 2004 in Asia . The album was a hit throughout Asia, selling more than 1 million copies and being certified gold in India. The album's lead single, "Sexy, Naughty, Bitchy" broke the top 10 on the Oricon charts in Japan and was one of the most successful Asian singles of the year; "Sexy, Naughty, Bitchy" dominated the airwaves and charts throughout Southeast Asia and India. The song, "I Believe", topped the charts in Hong Kong and was a major success throughout Southeast Asia whilst also reaching the top 20 throughout East Asia. Young promoted the album in Thailand and India in mid 2004.

The title track was used as the 2007 AFC Asian Cup theme song.

Track listing

Note: All tracks were produced, arranged and recorded by Hitvision for Murlyn Music AB.

Miscellaneous
 "Sexy, Naughty, Bitchy" was changed to "Sexy, Naughty, Cheeky" in Malaysia.
 "Sexy, Naughty, Bitchy" was covered by Lene Alexandra in her album "Welcome To Sillycone Valley". A Norwegian pop singer.
 "Sexy, Naughty, Bitchy" was performed live by Magnus Carlsson in a Swedish language version: "Sexig, Kaxig, Bitchig Man"
 "Sexy, Naughty, Bitchy" was covered by Baby VOX Re.V (2nd Album : Release Date: July 11, 2008), a Korean female Group. and changed to "Sexy".
 "I Believe" is chosen as the official theme song for 2007 AFC Asian Cup which Thailand co-hosts with Vietnam, Malaysia and Indonesia.
 "I Believe" was covered by Baby VOX Re.V (2nd Album : Release Date: July 11, 2008), a Korean female Group.

References

2004 albums
Tata Young albums
2007 AFC Asian Cup
AFC Asian Cup official songs and anthems